Santo Pietro Belvedere is a village in Tuscany, central Italy, administratively a frazione of the comune of Capannoli, province of Pisa. At the time of the 2001 census its population was 1,238.

Santo Pietro Belvedere is about 38 km from Pisa and 2 km from Capannoli.

References 

Frazioni of the Province of Pisa